Project Genesis is an Orthodox Jewish outreach organization based in Baltimore, Maryland, and created by Rabbi Yaakov Menken in 1993 to further the goals of the Baal teshuva movement. 

Project Genesis promotes further Jewish education as represented in Jewish sources.

Major projects

Torah.org

Torah.org is the main web site of Project Genesis. It has a network of online classes and a program in Jewish studies.

Teachers include Rabbis Yitzchok Adlerstein, Pinchas Avruch, Yosef Kalatsky, Mordechai Kamenetzky, Label Lam, Yaakov Menken, Naftali Reich, Berel Wein, Rebbetzin Leah Kohn and many others. It is claimed to have over 70,000 subscribers, with over 20,000 in the largest "class."

Ask the Rabbi
JewishAnswers.org was designed by Project Genesis to offer many different rabbis the opportunity to receive questions from their local audiences. Currently over 70 Rabbis participate in the program.

Cross-Currents.com
In 1998, Rabbi Yitzchok Adlerstein published an online journal of Jewish thought, called Cross-Currents, with articles written by himself and others. Publication later lapsed.

In 2004, Rabbi Yaakov Menken of Project Genesis suggested to Rabbi Adlerstein the development of an online Jewish weblog using the same technology that created Cross-Currents.com.

References

External links
Project Genesis website
Torah.org ("flagship" website)
Cross-Currents

Orthodox Judaism in Baltimore
Judaism websites
Orthodox Jewish outreach
Orthodox Judaism in Maryland